"The Adventure of the Empty House", one of the 56 Sherlock Holmes short stories written by Sir Arthur Conan Doyle, is one of 13 stories in the cycle collected as The Return of Sherlock Holmes. It was first published in Collier's in the United States on 26 September 1903, and in The Strand Magazine in the United Kingdom in October 1903.

Public pressure forced Conan Doyle to bring the sleuth back to life, and explain his apparently miraculous survival after his deadly struggle with Professor Moriarty in "The Final Problem". This is the first Holmes story set after his supposed death at the Reichenbach Falls, as recounted in "The Final Problem". The Hound of the Baskervilles had seen the return of a pre-Reichenbach Falls Sherlock Holmes, which whetted readers' appetites.

Doyle ranked "The Adventure of the Empty House" sixth in his list of his twelve favorite Holmes stories.

Plot 
The story takes place in 1894, three years after the apparent death of Sherlock Holmes. On the night of March 30, an apparently unsolvable locked-room murder takes place in London: the killing of the Honourable Ronald Adair, son of the Earl of Maynooth, a colonial governor in Australia. Adair was in his sitting room, working on accounts of some kind, as indicated by the papers and money found by police. He liked playing whist and regularly did so at several clubs, but never for great sums of money. It does, however, come out that he won as much as £420 in partnership with Colonel Sebastian Moran. The motive does not appear to be robbery as nothing has been stolen, and it seems that Adair had not an enemy in the world. It seems odd that Adair's door was locked from the inside. The only other way out was the open window, and there was a 20-foot (about 6 m) drop below it onto a flower bed, which shows no sign of being disturbed. Adair was killed with a soft-nosed revolver bullet to the head. No one in the area at the time heard a shot.

In April, Dr. Watson (now a widower), having retained an interest in crime from his previous association with Holmes, visits the murder scene at 427 Park Lane. He sees a plainclothes detective there with police, and also runs into an elderly deformed book collector, knocking several of his books to the ground. The encounter ends with the man snarling in anger and going away. However, that is not the last that Watson sees of him, for a short time later, the man comes to Watson's study in Kensington to apologize for his earlier behaviour. Once he manages to distract Watson's attention for a few seconds, he transforms himself into Sherlock Holmes, astonishing Watson so much that he faints to the ground "for the first and last time in my life."

Contrary to what Watson believed, Holmes won against Professor Moriarty at Reichenbach Falls, flinging him down the waterfall with the help of baritsu, the Japanese system of wrestling, and then climbing up the cliff beside the path to make it appear as though he, too, had fallen to his death. This was a plan that Holmes had just conceived to defend against Moriarty's confederates. However, at least one of them knew that he was still alive and tried to kill him by dropping rocks down on the ledge where he had taken refuge. Hurriedly climbing back down the cliff—and falling the last short distance to the path—Holmes ran for his life and, by the next week, he was in Florence. Holmes apologizes to Watson for the deception needed to outwit his enemies, and describes his three years' exploits, explaining that he spent the next few years traveling to various parts of the world. First, he went to Tibet and wandered for two years, even attaining entry to Lhasa and met the "head lama". Afterward, Holmes travelled incognito as a Norwegian explorer named Sigerson. Then, he went to Persia, with Holmes entering Mecca, and then to a brief stopover with the Khalifa in Khartoum. Finally, before returning, Holmes spent time doing chemical research on coal tar derivatives in Montpellier, France. However, Holmes was finally brought back to London by the news of Adair's murder. During all this time, the only people who knew that Holmes was alive were Moriarty's henchmen and Holmes's brother Mycroft, who provided him with the money he needed.

Holmes tells Watson that they are going to do some dangerous work that evening, and after a roundabout trip through the city they enter an empty house, an abandoned building known as Camden House whose front room overlooks—to Watson's great surprise—Baker Street. Holmes's room can be seen across the street, and more surprisingly still, Holmes can be seen silhouetted against the blind: it is a lifelike waxwork bust, moved regularly from below by Mrs. Hudson to simulate life. Holmes employs the dummy because he was seen by one of Moriarty's men, and thus he expects an attempt on his life that very night. Holmes and Watson wait two hours—until approximately midnight—in the abandoned Camden House. A sniper, who has taken the bait, fires a specialized air gun to assassinate his foe. Surprisingly, he chooses Camden House as his vantage point.

Once the ruffian shoots his air gun, scoring a direct hit on Holmes's dummy across the street, Holmes and Watson are on him, and he is soon disarmed and restrained. While Watson knocks down the enemy, Holmes summons the police by blowing a whistle. They are led by Inspector Lestrade, who arrests the gunman. It is none other than Colonel Moran, Adair's whist partner, and the same man who threw rocks down on the ledge at Holmes at Reichenbach Falls. Holmes does not wish the police to press charges of attempted murder in connection with what Moran has just done. Instead, he tells Lestrade to charge him with actual murder, for Moran is the man who murdered Adair. The air gun, it turns out, has been specially designed to shoot revolver bullets, and a quick forensics check of the one that "killed" his dummy shows, as Holmes expected, that it matches the bullet used to kill Adair.

Holmes and Watson then go to their old apartment in Baker Street, where Holmes' rooms were kept as he had left them thanks to Mycroft's supervision. Moran's motive in killing Adair is a matter of speculation even for Holmes. Nonetheless, his theory is that Adair had caught Moran cheating at cards, and threatened to expose his dishonourable behaviour. Moran therefore got rid of the one man who could rob him of his livelihood, for he earned a living playing cards crookedly, and could ill afford to be barred from all his clubs.

Publication history
"The Adventure of the Empty House" was published in the US in Collier's on 26 September 1903, and in the UK in The Strand Magazine in October 1903. The story was published with seven illustrations by Frederic Dorr Steele in Collier's, and with seven illustrations by Sidney Paget in the Strand. It was included in the short story collection The Return of Sherlock Holmes, which was published in the US in February 1905 and in the UK in March 1905.

Adaptations

Film and television
This story was adapted as a short film released in 1921 as part of the Stoll film series starring Eille Norwood as Holmes.

The 1931 film The Sleeping Cardinal (also known as Sherlock Holmes' Fatal Hour) is loosely based on "The Adventure of the Empty House" and "The Final Problem".

Many elements of "The Adventure of the Empty House" were used in the 1939–1946 Sherlock Holmes film series starring Basil Rathbone and Nigel Bruce. In Sherlock Holmes and the Secret Weapon (1943), Holmes disguises himself as a German bookseller in Switzerland. The Woman in Green (1945) uses the scene in which a sniper attempts to shoot Holmes from across the street and shoots a wax bust instead, and is apprehended by Holmes and Watson who lie in wait. Colonel Sebastian Moran appears as the villain in Terror by Night (1946) as the last of Moriarty's gang.

The story was adapted for a 1951 TV episode of We Present Alan Wheatley as Mr Sherlock Holmes in... starring Alan Wheatley as Holmes, Raymond Francis as Dr. Watson and Bill Owen as Inspector Lestrade. The episode is now lost.

The story was adapted in 1980 as an episode of the Soviet TV series The Adventures of Sherlock Holmes and Dr. Watson starring Vasily Livanov. The episode has some minor departures: Moran tries to shoot Holmes during his fight with Moriarty (he actually appears in the story before Moriarty, and both Holmes and Watson are aware of his motive to kill Adair from early on), with Holmes pretending to be hit to fake his death, Adair is still alive at the start of the episode, Watson unsuccessfully tries to protect him as instructed by Holmes, and Watson briefly becomes a prime suspect in Adair's murder.

The story was later adapted in 1986 as an episode of The Return of Sherlock Holmes starring Jeremy Brett. The episode is rather faithful to Doyle's story, except that Moran tries to shoot Holmes in Switzerland instead of dropping boulders on him, and it is Watson – not Holmes – that deduces the reason that Moran had for killing Ronald Adair. It was the first episode to feature Edward Hardwicke as Dr Watson, replacing David Burke who had played the role in the preceding episodes (Hardwicke reenacted a scene from "The Final Problem" in a flashback, consisting of Watson at the waterfall shouting to Holmes and reading his letter, which had been performed by Burke).

"The Adventure of the Empty House" was adapted as an episode of the animated television series Sherlock Holmes in the 22nd Century. The episode, also titled "The Adventure of the Empty House", first aired in 1999.

In "The Empty Hearse", the first episode of the third series of Sherlock starring Benedict Cumberbatch which aired on 1 January 2014, Holmes returns to London two years (instead of three) after faking his death. Although Watson is surprised that Sherlock is alive, he is furious that Sherlock didn't contact him in the last two years. He reluctantly teams up with Sherlock to investigate an underground terrorist network.

Radio

Edith Meiser adapted the story as an episode of the American radio series The Adventures of Sherlock Holmes. The episode aired on 5 October 1932, with Richard Gordon as Sherlock Holmes and Leigh Lovell as Dr. Watson. A remake of the script aired on 15 October 1936 (with Gordon as Holmes and Harry West as Watson).

Meiser also adapted the story as an episode of the American radio series The New Adventures of Sherlock Holmes, with Basil Rathbone as Holmes and Nigel Bruce as Watson, that aired on 29 September 1940. Another episode in the same series that was also adapted from the story aired on 11 April 1948 (with John Stanley as Holmes and Alfred Shirley as Watson).

John Gielgud played Holmes with Ralph Richardson as Watson in a radio adaptation of the story that aired on NBC radio on 24 April 1955.

Michael Hardwick adapted the story as a radio production that aired on the BBC Light Programme in 1961, as part of the 1952–1969 radio series starring Carleton Hobbs as Holmes and Norman Shelley as Watson, with Noel Johnson as Colonel Moran.

"The Empty House" was dramatised for BBC Radio 4 in 1993 by Bert Coules as part of the 1989–1998 radio series starring Clive Merrison as Holmes and Michael Williams as Watson. It featured Michael Pennington as Professor Moriarty, Frederick Treves as Colonel Moran, Donald Gee as Inspector Lestrade, and Peter Penry-Jones as Sir John.

"The Adventure of the Empty House" was combined with "The Final Problem" for an episode of The Classic Adventures of Sherlock Holmes, a series on the American radio show Imagination Theatre, starring John Patrick Lowrie as Holmes and Lawrence Albert as Watson. The episode, titled "The Return of Sherlock Holmes", first aired in 2009.

Other media
The story, along with "The Disappearance of Lady Frances Carfax", "The Adventure of Charles Augustus Milverton", and "The Red-Headed League", provided the source material for the 1923 play The Return of Sherlock Holmes.

In 1975, DC Comics published Sherlock Holmes #1, a comic which adapted "The Adventure of the Empty House" and "The Final Problem". It was intended to be an ongoing series, but future issues were cancelled due to low sales.

In the last short story in the book Flashman and the Tiger (1999) by George MacDonald Fraser, Fraser's anti-hero Harry Flashman sets out to murder Moran, who is blackmailing Flashman's granddaughter. He trails Moran to Camden House, but instead witnesses Holmes capture him.

References
Notes

Sources

External links

Empty House, The Adventure of the
1903 short stories
Short stories adapted into films
Fiction set in 1894
Works originally published in Collier's